The Teke languages are a group of Bantu languages spoken by the Teke people in the western Congo and in Gabon. They are coded Zone B.70 in Guthrie's classification. According to Nurse & Philippson (2003), the Teke languages apart from West Teke form a valid node with Tende (part of B.80): 

Tsege
Teghe (Tɛgɛ, North Teke)
Ngungwel (Ngungulu, NE Teke) – Central Teke (Njyunjyu/Ndzindziu, Boo/Boma/Eboo)
Tio (Bali) – East Teke (Mosieno, Ng'ee/Ŋee)
Kukwa (Kukuya, South Teke)
Fuumu (South Teke) – Wuumu (Wumbu)
Tiene (B.80)
Mfinu (B.80)
Mpuono (B.80)

Pacchiarotti et al. (2019) retain West Teke and include additional B.80 languages:
Teke (Kasai–Ngounie)
Boma Nkuu
Wuumu-Mpuono
Mfinu
Kwa South: East Teke
Kwa–Kasai North
Boma Yumu
Sakata
Tiinic: Boma Nord, Kempee, Tiene
Central Kasai–Ngounie
Ngungwel, Central Teke (Teke-Eboo-Nzikou)
Interior Kasai–Ngounie
Teke-Fuumu
Teke-Kukuya
Teke-Tyee
West Kasai–Ngounie
Teke-Tsaayi
Mbere: Kaningi, Ndumu, Latege, Mbere-Mbamba, Tchitchege
Teke-Laali, Yaka, Njebi, Tsaangi, Duma, Wandji, Vili of Ngounie

Footnotes